The Vision of Saint Anthony of Padua is a 1656 oil on canvas painting by Bartolomé Esteban Murillo, commissioned by the chapter of Seville Cathedral as the altarpiece for its chapel of Saint Anthony of Padua, where it still hangs. It replaced an altarpiece by Bernardo Simón de Pineda.

During the French occupation of Seville in the Peninsula War, the cathedral treasury was sacked by troops under Nicolas Jean-de-Dieu Soult. Murillo's Immaculate Conception and Birth of the Virgin were taken and Vision was almost also taken, but the town council proposed exchanging it for Nativity of the Virgin and so it remained in the chapel.

In November 1874, it was discovered that thieves had cut out the portion depicting Saint Anthony. Then, in January 1875, a Spanish immigrant attempted to sell the same fragment to a New York City art gallery. The man stated it was a complete original by Murillo, Saint Anthony being one of the artist's favorite subjects. The owner of the gallery, Hermann Schaus, negotiated a price of $250 and contacted the Spanish consulate. Upon securing the sale, Schaus sent it to the Spanish Consulate, which shipped it to Seville via Havana and Cadiz, was returned to the cathedral and added back into the work in 1875 by the restorer Salvador Martínez Cubells.

References

1656 paintings
Paintings by Bartolomé Esteban Murillo
Paintings depicting Jesus
Angels in art
Paintings in Seville
Paintings of Anthony of Padua